Maksim Aleksandrovich Tyulin (born 4 March 2003) is a Russian football player.

Club career
He made his debut in the Russian Football National League for FC Volgar Astrakhan on 8 August 2021 in a game against FC KAMAZ Naberezhnye Chelny.

References

External links
 
 
 Profile by Russian Football National League

2003 births
Living people
Russian footballers
Association football defenders
FC Volgar Astrakhan players
Russian First League players